Charles Britton Fulton (May 12, 1910 – May 15, 1996) was a United States district judge of the United States District Court for the Southern District of Florida.

Education and career

Born in Fallon, Nevada Fulton received a Bachelor of Laws from the Fredric G. Levin College of Law at the University of Florida in 1935. He was in private practice of law in West Palm Beach, Florida from 1935 to 1963. He was an assistant state attorney general of Florida in 1942. He was in the United States Naval Reserve from 1942 to 1946. He was General Counsel of the Board of Commissioners of the Port of Palm Beach District from 1950 to 1963. He was president, Chairman of the Board and General Counsel for Home Federal Savings and Loan Association of Palm Beach, Florida from 1958 to 1963.

Federal judicial service

Fulton was nominated by President John F. Kennedy on April 4, 1963, to the United States District Court for the Southern District of Florida, to a new seat created by 75 Stat. 80. He was confirmed by the United States Senate on April 24, 1963, and received his commission on April 26, 1963. He served as Chief Judge from 1966 to 1977. He assumed senior status on June 30, 1978. His service was terminated on May 15, 1996, due to his death in West Palm Beach.

References

Sources
 

1910 births
1996 deaths
People from Fallon, Nevada
University of Florida alumni
People from West Palm Beach, Florida
United States Navy officers
Judges of the United States District Court for the Southern District of Florida
United States district court judges appointed by John F. Kennedy
20th-century American judges
20th-century American lawyers